Rumor Scanner Bangladesh (Bengali: রিউমর স্ক্যানার বাংলাদেশ) is a fact checking or information verification organization of Bangladesh recognized by the International Fact Checking Network.  It was established on March 17, 2020. Its main aim is to prevent ongoing rumors and fake news of Bangladesh and convey the correct information to the people. It publishes fact-check stories through web content as well as digital banners. Its headquarters is located in Dhaka.

History 
It debuted on March 17, 2020 to address the negativity of various rumors including the Corona pandemic. Among its founders are Sumon Ahmed, Sakiuzzaman and Sayeed Joy. Within a short period of its establishment, it gained the recognition of the International Fact Checking Network।

Method 
It verifies data through a total of eight processes. Namely: solicitation, active monitoring team, selection of claims for verification, research, report writing and editing, digital banner, rating and revision.

Annual report 
It published 1,400 fact-check reports in 2022. Among them, 82 reports were published in January, 90 in February, 119 in March, 90 in April, 72 in May, 130 in June, 105 in July, 150 in August, 133 in September, 130 in October, 142 in November and 157 in December.

References

External links 

 Rumor Scanner Bangladesh on Facebook
Internet properties established in 2020
Fact-checking websites
Bangladeshi news websites